The Mühlsturzhörner are two summits in the Reiter Alm in the Berchtesgaden Alps in the Upper Bavarian county of Berchtesgadener Land.

Rockfall 
On 8 September 1999,  of rock broke off in the summit area of the Kleines Mühlsturzhorn and crashed into the Klausbach valley.

Alpinism 
The unmarked normal route to the Großes Mühlsturzhorn runs from the northwest via the Mayrbergscharte gap and the Stadelhorn (grade II). There are other unmarked ascents from the north via the Mühlsturzkar (II) and up the south face (II).

Well known climbing tours are the Alte Südkante (grade VII-, first climbed in 1930 by Huber and Mitterer) and the Direkte Südkante (VI/A1 or VIII-, first achieved in 1936 by Anderl Hinterstoißer and Toni Kurz shortly before Kurz's death on the north face of the Eiger).

Literature 
 Bernhard Kühnhauser: Alpenvereinsführer Berchtesgadener Alpen mit Hochkönig. Bergverlag Rother, Munich 2011, pp. 175–176, 460–463.
 Walter Pause, Jürgen Winkler: Im extremen Fels – 100 Kletterführen in den Alpen. BLV-Verlagsgesellschaft, Munich, 1977, .
 Richard Goedeke: Kletterführer Bayerische Alpen, Nordtirol. Bergverlag Rother, Munich, 2009, pp. 160–173

External links 

 Großes Mühlsturzhorn: Direkte Südkante, photographs and description

Two-thousanders of Germany
Berchtesgadener Land
Mountains of the Alps
Berchtesgaden Alps